Carbotubulus is a genus of extinct worm belonging to the group Lobopodia and known from the Carboniferous Carbondale Formation of the Mazon Creek area in Illinois, US. A monotypic genus, it contains one species Carbotubulus waloszeki. It was discovered and described by Joachim T. Haug, Georg Mayer, Carolin Haug, and Derek E.G. Briggs in 2012. With an age of about 300 million years, it is the first long-legged lobopodian discovered after the period of Cambrian explosion.

Discovery and naming 
Carbotubulus, represented by a single fossil, was discovered by Joachim T. Haug (University of Greifswald, Germany), Georg Mayer (Leipzig University), Carolin Haug (Yale University, US), and Derek E.G. Briggs (Yale University) from the Carbondale Formation (Francis Creek Shale Member) of the Mazon Creek area in Illinois, US. It was recovered from the location named Pit 11 along with a fossil of an extinct velvet worm Helenodora inopinata (also mentioned as Ilyodes inopinata). The original fossil is kept at the Royal Ontario Museum in Toronto.

The name is derived from Latin words, carbo, referring to the geological age Carboniferous; and tubulus, meaning "small pipe", a description for the pipe-like legs. The specific name is after the German zoologist Dieter Waloszek, one of the leaders in the study of arthropod evolution.

Description 
Carbotubulus is a soft-bodied worm with stumpy legs called lobopods. It has nine pairs of lobopods that are tube-like and elongated. Unlike other lobopodians, its head is relatively large and cylindrical in shape, occupying about one-third of the body length. In other related hallucigeniid worms, the head is usually rounded and tiny such that it is often difficult to describe. Living around 300 million years ago, it supports the fact that Cambrian-type worms survived for over 200 million years after extinction events during the Middle Cambrian (between 510 and 502 million years ago) by which most Cambrian animals disappeared. Majority of the long-legged lobopodians such as Hallucigenia, Paucipodia and Orstenotubulus are known only during the Cambrian explosion.

When Carbotubulus was first described, its systematic position was not clear and was loosely assigned to the phylum Arthropoda. Discovery of Cambrian lobopod Ovatiovermis cribratus from the Burgess Shale in 2017 led to a reanalysis of lobopodian classification, and Carbotubulus was assigned to a group Panarthropoda, specifically belonging to the family Hallucigeniidae along with the various species of Hallucigenia and Cardiodictyon catenulum. This classification is still controversial, especially after the discovery of the second post-Cambrian (Silurian) long-legged lobopodian, Thanahita distos, from the Herefordshire Lagerstätte at the England–Wales border in UK in 2018. The new interpretation suggest that Carbotubulus and Cardiodictyon may lie outside the hallucigeniid family.

References 

Fossil taxa described in 2012
Carboniferous Illinois
Lobopodia
Carboniferous genus extinctions